Totem and Ore is a collection of 5 000 photographs taken by B Wongar in the 1960s and early 1970s. The photographs were taken in northern and central Australia. The collection is about tragedy of Australian Aborigines - the people who lived through dual tragedy, the mining of uranium  and the subsequent British nuclear testing in that area. To deflect any criticism of the testing Australian government enacted Australian Atomic Energy Act forbidding publishing any kind of information about it. The penalty for violating the Act was imprisonment up to 20 years. The uranium mining and nuclear testing destroyed Australian Aborigines natural habitat and decimated their population in northern and central Australia.

During debate in Australian Parliament on the second report of the Aboriginal Land Rights Commission, an exhibition of this photograph collection, named Boomerang and Atom, at the Parliamentary Library of Australia in Canberra, was opened in September 1974. Two days after opening, the exhibition was banned by the government authorities. The collection for decades was politically unacceptable for publication in Australia and the United Kingdom.

A part of confronting photographs of this collection (90) was originally published in Germany in the 1980s  under the Bumerang und Bodenschätze title and, in 2006, published as a nonfictional book by Dingo Books in Australia.

In 2019, Waikato Institute of Technology (Wintec) academic and filmmaker John Mandelberg released a documentary film, Totem & Ore, inspired by, not replicating the Wongar's book. For Mandelberg, it has been a journey explained as,
I was fascinated by his story. He was from Eastern Europe and wrote fiction like an Aboriginal about the clash between white people and Aborigines. His first three novels became known as ‘the nuclear trilogy’ and they told a grim story about the testing that took place in the 1950s. He showed that uranium dislocated communities where testing took place.
Mandelberg's documentary had its world premiere at the Hiroshima International Film Festival on 24 November 2019 and became part of the Hiroshima Peace Memorial Museum collection.

References

Books about Indigenous Australians
2006 non-fiction books
Nuclear history
Books about nuclear issues